Mofizul Islam is a Bangladesh Nationalist Party politician and the former Member of Parliament of Comilla-13.

Career
Islam was elected to parliament from Comilla-13 as a Bangladesh Nationalist Party candidate in 1979.

Death
Islam died on 25 December 1991.

References

Bangladesh Nationalist Party politicians
1991 deaths
2nd Jatiya Sangsad members